Côme-Damien Degland (6 July 1787 – 1 January 1856, Lille) was a French physician and zoologist.

Biography
Degland was born at Armentières, and lived in Lille for most of his life, where he was the chief of the Hôpital Saint-Sauveur, and where he died. He participated in the founding of the Lille Natural History Museum, which owed much of its original zoological collection to purchases he made. He published a catalogue of the museums beetles in 1821, and a two-volume catalogue of the birds of France and Europe in 1849. With Zéphirin Gerbe, he was co-author of Ornithologie européenne, ou, Catalogue descriptif, analytique et raisonné des oiseaux observés en Europe (second edition, 1867). 

A bird species, the white-winged scoter (Melanitta deglandi), is named after Degland.

References 

1787 births
1856 deaths
People from Armentières
French zoologists
19th-century French physicians